Nicholas B. Nelson (born December 5, 1995) is an American professional baseball pitcher for the Philadelphia Phillies of Major League Baseball (MLB). He has previously played in MLB for the New York Yankees.

Career

New York Yankees
Nelson attended Rutherford High School in Panama City, Florida. He drafted by the San Francisco Giants in the 31st round of the 2014 MLB draft, but did not sign and played college baseball at Gulf Coast Community College. He was then drafted by the New York Yankees in the fourth round of the 2016 MLB draft and signed.

Nelson made his professional debut with the Pulaski Yankees, going 0–3 with a 3.38 ERA over  innings. He pitched 2017 with the Charleston RiverDogs, compiling a 3–12 record with a 4.56 ERA over 22 starts, and 2018 with Charleston, Tampa Tarpons and Trenton Thunder, pitching to a combined 8–6 record with a 3.55 ERA over 26 games (25 starts) between the three teams. He pitched 2019 with Tampa, Trenton, and the Scranton/Wilkes-Barre RailRiders, going 8–3 with a 2.81 ERA over 18 games (17 starts), striking out 114 over  innings.

Nelson was added to the Yankees' MLB roster on July 26, 2020. He made his MLB debut in the August 1 game against the Boston Red Sox, pitching three shutout innings in relief, and was credited with the win.

Philadelphia Phillies
The Yankees traded Nelson and Donny Sands to the Philadelphia Phillies for T. J. Rumfield and Joel Valdez on November 19, 2021.

Personal life
Nelson is married to his wife, Abigail. At the time of his MLB debut, his daughter, Hynleigh, was 11 months old.

References

External links

1995 births
Living people
Baseball players from Florida
Charleston RiverDogs players
Gulf Coast State Commodores baseball players
Major League Baseball pitchers
New York Yankees players
People from Panama City, Florida
Philadelphia Phillies players
Pulaski Yankees players
Scranton/Wilkes-Barre RailRiders players
Tampa Tarpons players
Trenton Thunder players